The 1967–68 Yugoslav Ice Hockey League season was the 26th season of the Yugoslav Ice Hockey League, the top level of ice hockey in Yugoslavia. Eight teams participated in the league, and Jesenice have won the championship.

Final ranking
Jesenice
Medveščak
Kranjska Gora
Partizan
Olimpija
Beograd
Mladost
Red Star

References

External links
Yugoslav Ice Hockey League seasons

Yugoslav
Yugoslav Ice Hockey League seasons
1967–68 in Yugoslav ice hockey